Olympic F.C. was an English association football club, originally from Blackheath in London.

History
The club was founded in 1870 as the works side of Hitchcock, Williams & Co, textile manufacturers near St Paul's Cathedral.  The earliest record of any match played by the club is in October 1873.

Although the club played a large number of matches throughout the late 1870s (for instance in 1877-78 the club had a record of 10 wins, 3 draws, and 5 defeats), the club did not enter the FA Cup until 1881-82, losing to the Old Harrovians in the first round.  Despite the lack of interest in the national competition, the club was a founder member of the London Football Association in 1882.

The club's only other entry to the Cup was the following year, when it lost to the United Hospitals club in the first round.  Even when qualifying rounds were introduced in 1888-89 the club did not put in an entry.

As the Olympic remained a works side, it could not compete at the top level of the game in the professional era, and it is unclear when the club disbanded.  The club is listed as a London Football Association founder member in 1892 and played in the London Senior Cup until 1905-06.  The club's biggest honour was winning the City of London Shield in 1898.

Grounds

The club originally played in Blackheath, using the Hare & Billett for its facilities.  By 1881 it had moved its facilities to the Freemasons' Tavern in Romford Road, Forest Gate, suggesting its regular pitch was in West Ham Park.

Colours

References

Defunct football clubs in England
Defunct football clubs in London
Association football clubs established in the 19th century